José Ríos Ortega (born 15 March 1974 in Premià de Dalt, Barcelona) is a Spanish runner. He specializes in the 10,000 metres and marathon. He won the Lake Biwa Marathon in 2006.

Achievements

Personal bests
3000 metres – 7:42.08 min (2002)
5000 metres – 13:07.59 min (2000)
10,000 metres – 27:22.20 min (2000)
Marathon – 2:07:42 hrs (2004)

References

External links

Spanish Olympic Committee

1974 births
Living people
Spanish male long-distance runners
Spanish male marathon runners
Athletes (track and field) at the 2000 Summer Olympics
Athletes (track and field) at the 2004 Summer Olympics
Athletes (track and field) at the 2008 Summer Olympics
Olympic athletes of Spain
European Athletics Championships medalists
Athletes from Barcelona